CSK Auto, Inc. was a specialty retailer of automotive parts and accessories in the western United States.  CSK Auto became a publicly traded company in March 1998, headquartered in Phoenix, Arizona, and grew through a combination of acquisitions and organic growth. It was acquired in 2008 by O'Reilly Automotive.

Operations
As of January 29, 2006, CSK operated 1,273 stores in 22 states spanning from Hawaii to Ohio, with principal concentration of stores in the Western United States. CSK operated its stores under four brand names:
 Checker Auto Parts, founded in 1969 in Phoenix, Arizona by Jacob Edward Henegar, with 442 stores in the Southwestern, Rocky Mountain, and Northern Plains states and Hawaii.
 Schucks Auto Supply, founded in 1917, with 226 stores in the Pacific Northwest and Alaska.
 Kragen Auto Parts, founded in 1947 by Al Kragen. Kragen Auto Parts had 493 stores, primarily in California.
 Murray's Discount Auto Stores, founded in 1972, with 112 stores in the Upper Midwest.

In the mid-2000s, CSK operated five value concept retail stores under the Pay N Save brand name in and around Phoenix, Arizona.  These stores sold primarily tools, hardware, sporting goods, housewares and other household goods, and seasonal items. To try and increase the tool business CSK built six stores that combined both auto parts and tools in Michigan, Colorado, Washington, and Arizona.  The company ceased operations of the Pay N Save stores on August 26, 2007.

CSK sponsored major league baseball in major markets throughout its trade areas, the 2Xtreme Racing monster truck team and the funny car driven by Del Worsham in the National Hot Rod Association. CSK was designated the Official Auto Parts Store of the NHRA.

CSK served both the do-it-yourself ("DIY") and the commercial installer, or do-it-for-me ("DIFM"), customer. The DIY market, which comprises customers who typically repair and maintain vehicles themselves, was the foundation of the business. The DIFM market comprised auto repair professionals, fleet owners, governments and municipalities.

History
CSK Auto experienced growth through a combination of acquisitions and a program of store construction and expansion. In 1997, CSK acquired 81 Trak Auto stores in Southern California, converting them to the Kragen name and product mix. This led to an extremely productive year in 1998, as annual sales broke the $1-billion barrier for the first time, and the company opened, expanded, or relocated a total of 130 more stores.
   
In June 1999, CSK added 86 more Checker stores in the Northern Plains states by acquiring the Big Wheel/Rossi Auto Parts chain, and in October of that year CSK completed its acquisition of 194 Al's and Grand Auto Supply stores in Washington, California, Idaho, Oregon, Nevada, and Alaska, solidifying its position as a retailer of automotive aftermarket parts and accessories in the western United States. To strengthen its position in the Northern Plains states, in April 2000, CSK purchased All-Car Distributors, operators of 21 stores in Wisconsin and one in Michigan. These stores operated under the Checker banner.  
   
On December 19, 2005, CSK announced it had completed the purchase of Murray's, Inc. and its subsidiary, Murray's Discount Auto Stores. The 110 Murray's automotive-part and accessory retail stores in Michigan, Illinois, Ohio and Indiana retained the Murray's name and operating model.

On April 1, 2008, O’Reilly Automotive, Inc. signed a deal to acquire all of CSK's common stock for approximately one billion dollars, including $500 million of debt. Starting in 2009, O'Reilly gradually rebranded Checker Auto Parts, Schucks Auto Supply, and Kragen Auto Parts stores as O'Reilly Auto Parts stores during a multi-year process that was finally completed in 2011.

On March 5, 2009 the SEC filed a civil injunction against 4 former members of CSK Auto. The former members were charged with accounting fraud for the years of 2002, 2003, and 2004.

References

External links 

O'Reilly Auto Parts

Automotive part retailers of the United States
Companies based in Phoenix, Arizona
Pay 'n Save
Retail companies disestablished in 2008